WLAW (1490 AM) is a radio station licensed to Whitehall, Michigan. The station broadcasts at 1490 kHz, simulcasting sister station WLAW-FM, and is owned by Cumulus Media.

As WUBR ("The Bear"), the station played adult standards. Later, the format changed to sports, carrying ESPN Radio. In December 2005, the station switched to a talk format, but returned to sports in simulcast with WJRW following the January 2019 discontinuation of WBBL-FM's sports format.

On August 24, 2021, the station changed its call sign to WLAW and then, on August 30, 2021, changed to a simulcast of "Nash Icon" country music WLAW-FM,

References

Michiguide.com – WODJ History

External links

LAW (AM)
Country radio stations in the United States
Muskegon County, Michigan
Cumulus Media radio stations
Radio stations established in 1955
1955 establishments in Michigan